The "Hadad Statue" is an 8th-century BC stele of King Panamuwa I, from the Kingdom of Bit-Gabbari in Sam'al. It is currently occupies a prominent position in the Vorderasiatisches Museum Berlin.

The inscription was discovered in 1890 in a village north east of Sam’al, during the period of the 1888-1902 German Oriental Society expeditions led by Felix von Luschan and Robert Koldewey.
The 34 line inscription is written in the Samalian language, considered to be on a dialect continuum between Phoenician and Aramaic.

Translation

The translation of the stele:

"I am Panamuwa, son of Qarli, king of Y’DY, who have erected this statue for Hadad in my eternal abode (burial chamber). The gods Hadad and El and Rašap and Rākib-El and Šamaš supported me. Hadad and El and Rākib-El and Šamaš and Rašap gave the scepter of dominion into my hands. Rašap supported me. So whatever I grasped with my hand […] and whatever I asked from the gods, they granted to me. The devastation(?) they restored. […] a land of barley […] a land of wheat and a land of garlic and a land of […]. Then […].  And […]. They cultivated the land and the vineyard. They dwelt there […].

I, Panamuwa, reigned on the throne of my father. Hadad gave into my hands a scepter of dominion. I cut off war and slander from the house of my father, and in my days also Y’DY ate and drank. In my days it was commanded throughout all my land to reconstruct ṬYRT and to reconstruct ZRRY and to build the villages of the dominion. Each one took his friend(?). Hadad and El and Rākib-El and Šamaš and ’Arqû-Rašap gave abundance. Greatness was granted to me and a sure covenant was concluded with me. In the days when I gained dominion, a gift-offering(?) was given to the gods; they took the land from my hand. Whatever I asked from the gods of the land, they gave to me. The gods of the land delighted in me, the son of Qarli.

Then Hadad gave the land for my […]. He singled me out to build and during my dominion, Hadad […] gave me the land to build. So I have built the land. I have erected this statue of Hadad and have built the place of Panamuwa, son of Qarli, king of Y’DY, with the statue—a burial chamber. Whoever of my sons (descendants) seizes the scepter, and sits on my throne, and maintains power, and sacrifices to this Hadad, […] an oath(?) and sacrifices this […] sacrifices to Hadad. Or, on the other hand, […] then he says: “May the soul (NBŠ) of Panamuwa eat with you and may the soul of Panamuwa drink with you.” May he remember eternally the soul of Panamuwa with Hadad. May he give this his sacrifice to Hadad. May he (i.e., Hadad) look favorably upon it. May it be a tribute for Hadad and for El and for Rākib-El and Šamaš and Rašap.

I am Panamuwa […] a house for the gods of this city. I built it and I caused the gods to dwell in it. During my reign, I allotted the gods a resting place. And they gave to me a seed of the bosom. […] whoever of my sons (descendants) seizes the scepter, and sits on my throne, and reigns over Y’DY, and maintains his power, and sacrifices to this Hadad, and does not remember the name of Panamuwa—who does not say: “May the soul of Panamuwa eat with Hadad, and may the soul of Panamuwa drink with Hadad”; then […] his sacrifice. May he (i.e., Hadad) not look favorably upon it, and whatever he asks, may Hadad not grant him. As for Hadad, may his wrath be poured out on him and may he not give to him to eat because of his rage; and may he withhold sleep from him in the night; and may terror be given to him. And may he not […] my kinsmen or relatives.

Whoever of my house seizes the scepter in Y’DY and sits on my throne and reigns in my place, may he not stretch his hand with the sword against anyone(?) of my house, either out of anger or out of violence. May he not do murder, either out of wrath or out of […]. And may no one be put to death, either by his bow or by his word or by his command.

But should (the future king’s) kinsman plot the destruction of one of his kinsmen or one of his relatives or one of his kinswomen, or should any member of my house plot destruction, then may (the king) assemble his male relatives and may he stand (the accused plotter) in the middle. Indeed, (the aggrieved victim of the plot) will pronounce his oath: “Your brother has caused my destruction!” If (the accused) denies it and (the aggrieved) lifts up his hands to the god of his father and says on his oath: “If I have put these words in the mouth of a stranger, say that my eyes are fixed or fearful, or that I have put my words in the mouth of enemies!”—then if (the accused) is male, may his male relatives be assembled and may they pound him with stones; and if (the accused) is female, then may her kinswomen be assembled and may they pound her with stones.

But if indeed ruin has struck him (a royal kinsman?) himself, then should your (i.e., the future king’s) eyes be weary of him on account of his bow or his power or his words or his instigation, then you […] his right […]. But if you slay him in violence or in anger, or you issue a decree against him, or you incite a stranger to slay him, may the gods […] slay […]"

Text
The text of the inscription below is presented in George Albert Cooke's 1903 "Text-book of North-Semitic Inscriptions: Moabite, Hebrew, Phoenician, Aramaic, Nabataean, Palmyrene, Jewish".

Gallery

References

Bibliography
 Sachau, E., "Zur historischen Geographie von Nordsyrien." SPAW 21 (1892): 313–38
 Belger, C., "Sendschirli II." Berliner philologische Wochenschrift 13 (1893): 355–56, 385-88
 Derenbourg, H., "Pînamou, fils de Karîl." REJ 26 (1893): 135–38
 Halévy, J., "Deux inscriptions sémitiques de Zindjîrlî." RevSém 1 (1893): 77–90
 Luschan, F. von, "Fünf Bildwerke aus Gerdschin."
 Müller, D.H., "Die altsemitischen Inschriften von Sendschirli." WZKM 7 (1893): 33–70, 113-40
 Schmidt, N. (1894). Immortality and the Hadad Statue. Journal of Biblical Literature, 13(1), 16-18. doi:10.2307/3268911

8th-century BC steles
1890 archaeological discoveries
Aramean kings
Ancient Near East steles
Aramaic inscriptions
KAI inscriptions
Antikensammlung Berlin